The Albany Trust Company Building is a historic commercial building located at 35 State Street at the corner of Broadway in Albany, New York.  It was built in 1904 and was designed by Marcus T. Reynolds in the Renaissance Revival style. Currently, it is the main offices of the Research Foundation for the State University of New York.

The building was listed on the National Register of Historic Places in 1973 as the First Trust Company Building. It is also a contributing property to the Downtown Albany Historic District.

History and description
The property at State Street and Broadway had been the site of a rounded building since the 1830s. In 1902, the Albany Trust Company asked prominent Albany architect Marcus T. Reynolds to design a new headquarters for the bank, and Reynolds decided that the new building would also be rounded. He made the curve the focus of the building by putting the main entrance at the corner, and by topping the building with a dome shape.  Extensions to the building were later added along both State Street and Broadway.

The interior features a circular banking floor.

See also
 National Register of Historic Places listings in Albany, New York

References

External links
 
 Historic photo from New York State Office of Parks, Recreation and Historic Preservation

Commercial buildings on the National Register of Historic Places in New York (state)
Commercial buildings completed in 1904
Buildings and structures in Albany, New York
Individually listed contributing properties to historic districts on the National Register in New York (state)
National Register of Historic Places in Albany, New York